Aliabad (also Romanized as ‘Alīābād; also known as Ali Abad Mo’men Abad) is a village in Momenabad Rural District, in the Central District of Sarbisheh County, South Khorasan Province, Iran. At the 2006 census, its population was 400, in 102 families.

References 

Populated places in Sarbisheh County